Crispy (later known as XPY) was a Danish dance-pop group, formed in Copenhagen in 1997 by music producer Mads B.B. Krog and vocalists Christian Møller and Mette Christensen. Their notable major hits are "Licky Licky" from the 1998 album The Game, and the 2000 single "In & Out". Three of their songs ("Bubble Dancer", "The Game" and "Kiss Me Red") were also featured in the four-panel dance game In the Groove.

Crispy's debut album, The Game, was recorded in 1997 and released the following year. The Japanese version of the album contained four exclusive bonus tracks, including two unreleased songs, "Bad Girls" and "Happy King". The group was successful in Scandinavia and Asia, and was awarded the Pop Shop Award '98 for best Scandinavian debut release in 1998 among 15 nominees. Crispy performed in over 150 concerts across Europe and also toured Japan in the years they were active.

Career

1997-1998: Beginning of Crispy and The Game
In 1997, young music producer Mads B.B. Krog decided to form a dance-pop act, featuring Mette and Christian as the vocalists. Crispy's first single, "Kiss Me Red", was released in February 1998 in Scandinavia, and enjoyed only moderate recognition at first. They released "Calendar Girl" in April. The single, "Licky Licky", was much more successful, reaching the top 20 of the major dance charts in Denmark later that year. The single "Love is Waiting" was released in May 1999.

Crispy released their debut album, The Game, in mid-1998. The album was recorded and mixed in Denmark, Sweden and Germany. Several editions of The Game were released, the most common being the release of 12 tracks. The Japanese edition contained four exclusive bonus tracks, including two previously-unreleased songs, "Bad Girls" and "Happy King". The group became well-established in the Danish dance-pop scene.

1999: Tour and success
At the end of 1998 Crispy went on a promotion tour in Japan, performing among large crowds in the cities of Tokyo, Nagoya and Osaka. They also visited Singapore and the Philippines, where their album had also sold very well, and performed in Europe over the following year.

2000: Second album's cancellation and closure of Crispy
After the success of The Game, Crispy decided to make a new album. They recorded a large number of tracks, and released two of them ("I Like..." and "In & Out") as singles. The album was planned to be released sometime in mid-2000, but the release was cancelled due to the lead vocalist, Mette Christensen, having to leave the group just days after the release of "In & Out" due to being diagnosed with cancer, and as she was not well enough to continue. Out of respect for Mette, Christian and Mads did not release any further material as Crispy; the group renamed themselves XPY, and released their next two singles, "L/R" and "La Fiesta", under that name.

2000-2001: Activities as XPY and disbandment
After Mette's exit in 2000, Danish singer and actress Gry Bay joined XPY as the group's new female vocalist. However, this new project was not as successful as Crispy, and the group disbanded permanently in 2001. 

Gry Bay later went on to achieve success as an actress in Denmark. Mads B.B. Krog became a businessman but remains a music producer and composer; he has released music under the name Blush and remixed the song "In & Out". Christian Møller retired from music, devoting himself to his personal life.

Members

Mette Christensen, also known as Icy B (Copenhagen, 25 September 1976 – October 2005), was Crispy's lead vocalist and co-wrote the song "Love Is Waiting". She had to leave the group because of illness and died of cancer at 29 years old.

Christian Møller (Copenhagen, born 16 December 1974) was Crispy's main composer and lyricist, and also provided the male backing vocals.

Mads B.B. Krog (Copenhagen, born 9 June 1976) helped write Crispy's songs with Christian and was the group's main producer.

Gry Bay (Frederiksberg, born 15 August 1974) became the lead vocalist of the group in 2000 after Mette's exit.

Discography

Albums
The Game (1 June 1998)

Singles

References

Danish Eurodance groups
Musical groups established in 1997
Musical groups disestablished in 2000
Danish pop music groups
Dance-pop groups
RCA Records artists